Arts and Science College, Honnavar is one of the institutions in Honnavar, Uttara Kannada district, Karnataka, India offering B.A and B.Sc. degrees.

The former principals
 VCi (1964-1968)

Notable alumni

External links
 S.D.M. Arts and Science College, website

Colleges in Karnataka
Universities and colleges in Uttara Kannada district